The Bride's Tomb is a Cultural Monument of Albania, located in Mullet, Tirana County.

References

Cultural Monuments of Albania
Buildings and structures in Tirana County
Ottoman mausoleums